The government of Leopoldo Calvo-Sotelo was formed on 27 February 1981, following the latter's election as Prime Minister of Spain by the Congress of Deputies on 25 February and his swearing-in on 26 February, as a result of Adolfo Suárez's resignation from the post on 29 January 1981.

Calvo-Sotelo's cabinet was composed mainly by members of the Union of the Democratic Centre (UCD) and a number of independents. It was automatically dismissed on 29 October 1982 as a consequence of the 1982 general election, but remained in acting capacity until the next government was sworn in.

Investiture

Council of Ministers
The Council of Ministers was structured into the offices for the prime minister and 15 ministries. From December 1981, the council would include two deputy prime ministers and a deputy ministry to the Prime Minister, without portfolio. From July 1982, the council would only include one deputy prime minister and the abolition of the deputy ministry to the Prime Minister.

Departmental structure
Leopoldo Calvo-Sotelo's government was organised into several superior and governing units, whose number, powers and hierarchical structure varied depending on the ministerial department.

Unit/body rank
() Secretary of state
() Undersecretary
() Director-general
() Autonomous agency
() Military & intelligence agency

Notes

References

External links
Governments. Juan Carlos I (20.11.1975 ...). CCHS-CSIC (in Spanish).
Governments of Spain 1977–1982. Ministers of Adolfo Suárez and Leopoldo Calvo-Sotelo. Historia Electoral.com (in Spanish).
The governments of the Union of the Democratic Centre (1977–1982). Lluís Belenes i Rodríguez History Page (in Spanish).

1981 establishments in Spain
1982 disestablishments in Spain
Cabinets established in 1981
Cabinets disestablished in 1982
Council of Ministers (Spain)